Kim Ho-kyung (Hangul: 김호경; born April 4, 1983), better known by his stage name Tei (Hangul: 테이), is a South Korean singer. He debuted in 2004 with the album, The First Journey.

Biography
"Tei": the name consists of "Te" and "i"; "Te" is a French character meaning "you". Tei, is meant as a wish for people to get closer through music. Born in South Korea, Tei's performance on stage in his high school was recorded and uploaded to a popular Korean website where he won a prize. He was invited to audition at JYP Entertainment Starlight Casting System and joined JYP Entertainment after he graduated from high school.

His hobbies include composing, movies, and writing. Before fame intervened, Tei wanted to be an architect, and studied towards that goal at Gyeongnam University. Tei sings and plays the guitar for his underground band.

In 2013, Tei finished his military service.

Career
While in high school, he led weekly performances with his underground band. Due to his singing abilities, he became known as the Mr. Big in school. When he was about to enter university, his composing talent and vocal abilities attracted the attention of JYP Entertainment. Tei joined JYP as a trainee and debuted after a three-year training period.

Discography

Studio albums

Charted singles

Radio programs
2007–2008: KBS Tei Music Island

Beginning in 2015: MBC Tei's Dreaming Radio

Korean drama
2007: Love Is Hurt (Chinese: 坏爱情, Korean: 못된사랑) KBS drama
2008: Aristocrat (Chinese: 食客, Korean:식객) SBS drama
2009: Can Anyone Love? (Chinese: 不是谁都能爱)
2022: Business Proposal (Korean: 사내 맞선) (Cameo)

Theater

Awards and nominations

References

External links
 Official website

1983 births
Living people
South Korean male television actors
K-pop singers
21st-century South Korean male singers